Russell Cunningham may refer to:
Russell Cunningham (producer), Australian film and television producer
Russell Cunningham (Canadian politician), Nova Scotia CCF leader, 1945–1953
Russell McWhortor Cunningham (1855–1921), American Democratic politician, acting Governor of Alabama, 1904–1905